SEFOR (Southwest Experimental Fast Oxide Reactor) was an experimental fast breeder reactor located in Cove Creek Township, Washington County, near Strickler, in northwest Arkansas (20 miles southwest of Fayetteville, Arkansas). The site consisted of a 20-Megawatt (thermal), Sodium-Cooled Test Reactor, a Shop Building, an Operations Building, a Maintenance Shed, and an Electrical Transformer yard. It operated from 1969 to 1972 when the program ended. It was then acquired by the University of Arkansas, in hopes that it could be used as a research facility in 1975, but it never happened. The University maintained the decommissioned site until finally receiving federal funds to dismantle the facility in 2016, which completed in 2019.

It used MOX fuel and liquid sodium cooling, and generated 20MW of heat but no electricity. It was constructed particularly to test the suggested inherent safety features of the oxide fuel/sodium cooling configuration, and in particular the effect on the core of thermal expansion, including in an accident situation. The belief that this would stabilize the core was confirmed.

The design concept of using thermal expansion to stabilize a reactor core has since been featured in other reactor designs, notably in the pebble bed reactor, which is however neither a fast neutron reactor nor a breeder reactor, and in subsequent Fast breeder reactors.

SEFOR operated from 1969 to 1972, when the original program was completed as planned. It was privately operated by General Electric and funded by the United States government through the Southwest Atomic Energy Associates, a nonprofit consortium formed by 17 power companies of the Southwest Power Pool and European nuclear agencies.

A proposal for funding to extend its operation to 1977 was rejected prior to the closure in 1972. The fuel and irradiated sodium coolant were removed and taken offsite later in 1972, and the facility was placed in safe storage. The reactor was acquired by the University of Arkansas in 1975, and was used to calibrate equipment and as a research tool for graduate students. SEFOR was designated a Nuclear Historic Landmark site in October 1986, and that same year the university stopped using the facility but continued to maintain surveillance through maintenance activities and periodic visits to the reactor. A caretaker also lived on site in the former Visitors’ Center.

Dismantlement 

By the early 2000s the site was considered contaminated and the university began seeking $16 million in funding for decontamination work. Arkansas Senator Blanche Lincoln had been trying to secure funds to clean up the site since 1999. In 2005 she introduced legislation to decommission and decontaminate SEFOR in the Energy Policy Act of 2005. Although the bill was approved and signed by President George W. Bush, money for cleaning up the site was not appropriated. In 2008 Senator Lincoln managed to get $2 million to start the dismantlement process added to an appropriations bill.

In 2009, it was announced that the University of Arkansas would get the $1.9 million from the U.S. Department of Energy for a "characterization study" to determine what would be required for cleaning up the site. On November 16, eight professionals from EnergySolutions, an international nuclear services company based in Salt Lake City and one of four companies who bid on the project, visited the SEFOR facility as the first stages of planning for a complete cleanup. The plan was supposed to be completed by January 2010. At that point the University would be able to apply for the estimated $20 million from the federal government for a complete clean up. SEFOR appeared on the Fiscal Year 2010 Energy and Water Development Appropriations Requests on Senator Mark Pryor's website. The project was described as a "demonstration project to test expedited procedures for a reactor site cleanup".

In September 2016 the University of Arkansas finally received a $10.5 million grant from the Department of Energy to decommission and dismantle the SEFOR site. On January 19, 2017 the University of Arkansas conducted public tours of the site ahead of large scale dismantling. The 84,000 pound radioactive core was removed by crane and placed in a carbon steel containment vessel October 16, 2018. The vessel was then welded shut and shipped out of state. The whole procedure took about 18 minutes. On April 18, Energy Solutions announced the cleanup project was completed at a community meeting at the Strickler Fire Department Community Center, and was awaiting a final report from the Arkansas Department of Environmental Quality, the Arkansas Department of Health and the U.S. Department of Energy to give an official ‘No Further Action is Required’ for the site.

Notes
"Atomic Pork", Susan Porter and Frieda Thomas, Fayetteville Free Weekly, Dec 8-14, 2005.

References

External links
 News report about the dismantling and public tours Youtube
 Vekshin, Alison (January 26, 2005). "Lincoln revives SEFOR clean-up bill". Arkansas News Bureau.
 Branam, Chris (July 30, 2005). "Energy bill OKs plan to clean up UA reactor site". NWAnews.com.
 American Nuclear Society: Nuclear Historic Landmark Award recipients.
 Taylor Wilson. Please enjoy this entertaining photo essay below from that original SEFOR visit on June 1, 2006. 
 Document from DOE archive (1MB PDF) — specifically the Introduction and Appendix A.1
 http://www.nwaonline.net/articles/2008/07/16/news/071708dcseformoney.txt
 http://lincoln.senate.gov/releases/02/07/2002725845.html
 http://www2.arkansasonline.com/news/2009/jul/22/ua-get-19-million-start-cleanup-sefor/
 http://www.emcbc.doe.gov/files/news/NR%20SEFOR%20Jul2109.pdf
 http://www.emcbc.doe.gov/sefor/
 http://dailyheadlines.uark.edu/16219.htm
 http://www.einnews.com/pr_news/346773101/doe-awards-southwest-experimental-fast-oxide-reactor-sefor-grant
 http://5newsonline.com/2016/10/10/deactivated-nuclear-reactor-site-to-be-cleaned-up/
 http://news.uark.edu/articles/35800/-10-5-million-grant-from-doe-to-fund-clean-up-of-former-nuclear-reactor-site
 http://5newsonline.com/2017/01/19/hundreds-tour-nuclear-reactor-in-strickler-prior-to-dismantle/
 http://5newsonline.com/2017/01/19/slideshow-tour-of-sefor-nuclear-reactor-ahead-of-dismantling/
 https://www.fox16.com/news/state-news/sefor-nuclear-reactor-removed-in-nwa/1529594478

Sefor
Former nuclear research institutes
Sefor
Sefor